The Kirkwall River is a river in Algoma District and Sudbury District in northeastern Ontario, Canada. It is in the James Bay drainage basin, and is a right tributary of the Dunrankin River.

Course
The river begins at an unnamed marsh in geographic Bonar Township, in the Unorganized North Part of Sudbury District, and flows northwest. The Dunrankin River flows via the Kapuskasing River, the Mattagami River and the Moose River to James Bay.

References

Rivers of Algoma District
Rivers of Sudbury District